Al-Muhafaza Sports Club is a Syrian professional football club based in Damascus. The team currently plays in Syrian League 1st Division the second division of Syrian football.

Stadium

Currently the team plays at the Al-Muhafaza Stadium with a capacity of 1,000 seats.

Honours
Syrian League 1st Division:
Champion : 1999, 2012
Damascus International Championship:
Runner-up : 2009

League participations
Syrian Premier League: 1999-2000, 2012–2018
Syrian League 1st Division: 2006–2012; since 2019

References

External links
Soccerway

Muhafaza
Sport in Damascus
Association football clubs established in 1988
1988 establishments in Syria